Globo is a Portuguese pay television channel owned by TV Globo, a Brazilian television network. Its programming is taken from TV Globo or GloboNews, along with Brazilian cinema. its flagship programming are Globo's Brazilian telenovelas. It also broadcasts talk shows, television series and sitcoms, such as Mais Você and Zorra Total. Despite being available only as an exclusive to NOS platform, it is one of the most watched television channels in Portugal. In 2016, it became available to subscribers of the FTTH service of Vodafone Portugal. Similarly to what happens in Brazil, Globo's main competitor is RecordTV's Europe unit.

References 

Television stations in Portugal
Television channels and stations established in 2012
2012 establishments in Portugal
TV Globo
Grupo Globo subsidiaries